The 1997 New Mexico Lobos football team represented the University of New Mexico in the 1997 NCAA Division I-A football season. The Lobos were led by sixth-year head coach Dennis Franchione, in his final year with the team, and played their home games at University Stadium in Albuquerque, New Mexico. They finished the regular season atop the Mountain Division of the Western Athletic Conference with a 6–2 conference record, and lost to Colorado State in the 1997 WAC Championship Game. New Mexico was invited to the 1997 Insight.com Bowl, their first bowl game since 1961, where they lost to Arizona, 14–20.

The season is also notable for the Lobos because their brief appearance in the Coaches' Poll in Week 15 is the last time that the team has been featured in either the Coaches' Poll or the AP Poll, .

Schedule

Source:

Roster

References

New Mexico
New Mexico Lobos football seasons
New Mexico Lobos football